Krista Marie Ritchie and Becca Michelle Ritchie are sisters and New York Times and USA Today bestselling authors of young adult and romance novels. Their first joint book, Addicted to You, was published in June 2013. Their most recent book, Misfits Like Us, was published in July 2022.

When she was fourteen years old, Becca independently published a young adult/urban fantasy novel titled Wynter Chelsea: The Legacy with Outskirts Press.

Bibliography 
Circus is Family Series (Previously Released as "Aerial Ethereal"):
 The Failed Audition (Previously released as "Amour Amour") (Circus Is Family #1) (2014)
 The Secret Ex-Boyfriend (Previously released as "Infini") (Circus is Family #2) (2017)
Addicted Series:
 Addicted to You (Addicted #1) (2013)
 Ricochet (Addicted #2) (2013)
 Addicted for Now (Addicted #3) (2013)
 Thrive (Addicted #4) (2014)
 Addicted After All (Addicted #5) (2014)
Calloway Sisters Series:
 Kiss the Sky (Calloway Sisters #1) (2014)
 Hothouse Flower (Calloway Sisters #2) (2014)
 Fuel the Fire (Calloway Sisters #3) (2015)
 Long Way Down (Calloway Sisters #4) (2015)
 Some Kind of Perfect (Calloway Sisters #5) (2016)
Bad Reputation Duet:

 Whatever It Takes (2020)
 Wherever You Are (2020)

Like Us Series:
 Damaged Like Us (Like Us #1) (2017)
 Lovers Like Us (Like Us #2) (2017)
 Alphas Like Us (Like Us #3) (2018)
 Tangled Like Us (Like Us #4) (20189
 Sinful Like Us (Like Us #5) (2019)
 Headstrong Like Us (Like Us #6) (2019)
 Charming Like Us (Like Us #7) (2020)
 Wild Like Us (Like Us #8) (2020)
 Fearless Like Us (Like Us #9) (2021)
 Infamous Like Us (Like Us #10) (2021)
 Misfits Like Us (Like Us #11) (2022)
 Unlucky Like Us (Like Us #12) (TBA)
 Nobody Like Us (Like Us #13) (TBA)
The Raging Ones Series:
 The Raging Ones (2018)
 The Last Hope (2019)
Standalone:
 Love & Other Cursed Things (2021)
Dishonestly Yours:
 Book 1 (2023)
 Book 2
 Book 3

References 

American writers of young adult literature